Kalika is a village development committee in Baglung District in the Dhawalagiri Zone of central Nepal. At the time of the 1991 Nepal census it had a population of 8,266 and had 1602 houses in the town.

References

Populated places in Baglung District